The 1944 United States presidential election in New York took place on November 7, 1944. All contemporary 48 states were part of the 1944 United States presidential election. Voters chose 47 electors to the Electoral College, which selected the president and vice president. New York was won by incumbent Democratic President Franklin D. Roosevelt, who was running against local Republican Governor Thomas E. Dewey. Roosevelt ran with U.S. Senator from Missouri Harry S. Truman, and Dewey ran with Ohio Governor John W. Bricker, an opponent during the 1944 Republican primaries, as vice president. 

New York weighed in for this election as 2% more Republican than the national average. The presidential election of 1944 was a very partisan for New York, with more than 99.6% of the electorate casting votes for either the Democratic Party or the Republican. In typical form for the time, the highly populated centers of New York City, Albany, Buffalo, and Rochester voted primarily Democratic, while the majority of smaller counties in New York turned out for Dewey as the Republican candidate. Much of Roosevelt's margin of victory was provided by his dominance in New York City. Roosevelt took over 60% of the vote in Manhattan, Brooklyn and the Bronx, and decisively won New York City as a whole, although the boroughs of Queens and Staten Island remained Republican as they had voted in 1940.

The immensely popular Roosevelt won the election in New York by a solid 5-point margin, despite it also being Dewey's home state. Dewey campaigned hard against much of President Roosevelt's New Deal, claiming that it suffocated job growth in the country, while Roosevelt's campaign focused on maintaining the New Deal, and putting an end to the war with Japan and Germany as quickly as possible. Governor Dewey's stance on the New Deal put him and his campaign in sharp contradiction with the majority voters across the country, including states such as New York, which had suffered through years of over 15% unemployment during the Great Depression, and who largely attributed the economic recovery to Roosevelt's leadership, and heightened federal regulation and spending.

The 1944 presidential election was the last time until 2016 in which both major party candidates declared New York as their home state.

Along with his first run for governor in 1938, the 1944 presidential election marked the only time that Dewey lost a statewide vote in New York. The 1944 presidential election was the only time that Dewey lost a statewide vote in New York during his time as governor, as Dewey would carry New York State in 1948 against Roosevelt's successor Harry S. Truman. Subsequent to 1944, Dewey would be reelected as Governor in 1946 and 1950 before not seeking reelection in 1954.

Results

Results by county

See also
 United States presidential elections in New York
 Presidency of Franklin D. Roosevelt
 Presidency of Harry S. Truman
 World War II
 Hell-Bent for Election

References

New York
1944
1944 New York (state) elections
Articles containing video clips